Limopsidae is a family of bivalves, related to the ark clams and bittersweets. This family contains about thirty species in seven genera.

Species
 Crenulilimopsis Kuroda & Habe, 1971 
 Cnisma Mayer, 1868 
 Empleconia Dall, 1908 
 Limarca Tate, 1886 
 Limopsis Sassi, 1827 
 Limopsis affinis A. E. Verrill, 1885
 Limopsis antillensis Dall, 1881 
 Limopsis aurita
 Limopsis cristata Jeffreys, 1876
 Limopsis davidis Hedley, 1899 original species description, pages 564–565.
 Limopsis davinae Esteves, 1984
 Limopsis galathea
 Limopsis hirtella Mabille & Rochebrune, 1889 
 Limopsis janeiroensis E. A. Smith, 1915
 Limopsis marionensis E. A. Smith, 1885 
 Limopsis minuta (Philippi, 1836)
 Limopsis multistrata
 Limopsis onchodes Dall, 1927
 Limopsis paucidentata Dall, 1886
 Limopsis pelagica E. A. Smith, 1885
 Limopsis perieri P. Fischer, 1869 
 Limopsis plana A. E. Verrill, 1885
 Limopsis radialis Dall, 1927
 Limopsis spicata Oliver & Allen, 1980
 Limopsis sulcata A. E. Verrill & Bush, 1898
 Limopsis surinamensis Oliver & Allen, 1980 
 Limopsis tenella Jeffreys, 1876
 Limopsis zealandica Hutton, 1873
 Nipponolimopsis Habe, 1951 
 Nucunella d'Orbigny, 1850

Limopsis
Species of the genus Limopsis are among the few suspension feeding deep-sea bivalves, and are absent from the continental shelf. They are relatively small, byssate (i.e. attached to the sea floor by strong threads, or byssus), and, while the viscera are reduced, there is a comparatively thick shell. Differences between species are usually defined by minor differences in gill and palp structure. The eggs are relatively few and of a size which suggests that the planktonic larvae do not feed.

References

 
Bivalve families